Tobias Salquist (born 18 May 1995) is a Danish footballer who plays as a centre-back for Silkeborg IF.

Club career

Silkeborg IF
Salquist joined Silkeborg IF from FC Midtjylland at the age of 16 as a U17-player.

Salquist had his Superliga debut on 25 April 2015, in a 0–1 defeat against FC Nordsjælland, where he replaced an injured Thorbjørn Holst Rasmussen in the 25th minute.

On 19 May 2015, Salquist signed a new three-year contract with Silkeborg.

On 30 May 2018, Silkeborg confirmed, that Salquist would leave the club in the summer, where his contract expired. At this time, there were rumors linking him together with a transfer to the Belgian club Waasland-Beveren. One day later, Salquist confirmed, that he was joining a Belgian club, without revealing which club.

Loan to Fjölnir
On 2 March 2016, Salquist was loaned out to Icelandic club Fjölnir.

Waasland-Beveren
On 11 June 2018, Waasland-Beveren confirmed that they had signed Salquist on a three-year contract.

Lillestrøm SK
On 7 January 2019, Lillestrøm SK confirmed that they had signed Salquist on a three-year contract. His former Silkeborg teammate Daniel A. Pedersen accidentally confirmed the transfer a few hours before the club itself released the news. On 7 September 2020 the club confirmed, that Salquist had agreed to terminate his contract so he could return to Denmark and be closer to his girlfriend, who was pregnant.

Hobro IK
After returning to Denmark, Salquist went on a trial at Esbjerg fB, but ended up joining Hobro IK on 9 September 2020, signing a deal for the rest of the year.

Return to Silkeborg
On 13 January 2021 Silkeborg IF confirmed, that Salquist had returned to the club on a three-year deal.

References

External links
 
 

1995 births
Living people
People from Ikast-Brande Municipality
Association football central defenders
Danish men's footballers
Danish expatriate men's footballers
Danish Superliga players
Úrvalsdeild karla (football) players
Belgian Pro League players
Eliteserien players
Silkeborg IF players
S.K. Beveren players
Lillestrøm SK players
Hobro IK players
Danish expatriate sportspeople in Iceland
Danish expatriate sportspeople in Belgium
Danish expatriate sportspeople in Norway
Expatriate footballers in Iceland
Expatriate footballers in Belgium
Expatriate footballers in Norway
FC Midtjylland players
Danish 1st Division players
Sportspeople from the Central Denmark Region